Vote counting is the process of counting votes in an election. It can be done manually or by machines. In the United States, the compilation of election returns and validation of the outcome that forms the basis of the official results is called canvassing.

Counts are simplest in elections where just one choice is on the ballot, and these are often counted manually. In elections where many choices are on the same ballot, counts are often done by computers to give quick results. Tallies done at distant locations must be carried or transmitted accurately to the central election office.

Manual counts are usually accurate within one percent. Computers are at least that accurate, except when they have undiscovered bugs, broken sensors scanning the ballots, paper misfeeds, or hacks. Officials keep election computers off the internet to minimize hacking, but the manufacturers are on the internet. They and their annual updates are still subject to hacking, like any computers. Further voting machines are in public locations on election day, and often the night before, so they are vulnerable.

Paper ballots and computer files of results are stored until they are tallied, so they need secure storage, which is hard. The election computers themselves are stored for years, and briefly tested before each election.

Despite the challenges to the U.S. voting process integrity in recent years, including multiple claims by Republican Party members of error or voter fraud in 2020 and 2021, a robust examination of the voting process in multiple U.S. states, including Arizona (where claims were most strenuous) found no basis in truth for those claims. The absence of error and fraud is partially attributable to the inherent checks and balances in the voting process itself, which are, as with democracy, built into the system to reduce their likelihood.

Manual counting

Manual counting, also known as hand-counting, requires a physical ballot that represents voter intent. The physical ballots are taken out of ballot boxes and/or envelopes, read and interpreted; then results are tallied.
Manual counting may be used for election audits and recounts in areas where automated counting systems are used.

Manual methods
One method of manual counting is to sort ballots in piles by candidate, and count the number of ballots in each pile. If there is more than one contest on the same sheet of paper, the sorting and counting are repeated for each contest. This method has been used in Burkina Faso, Russia, Sweden, United States (Minnesota), and Zimbabwe.

A variant is to read aloud the choice on each ballot while putting it into its pile, so observers can tally initially, and check by counting the piles. This method has been used in Ghana, Indonesia, and Mozambique. These first two methods do not preserve the original order of the ballots, which can interfere with matching them to tallies or digital images taken earlier.

Another approach is for one official to read all the votes on a ballot aloud, to one or more other staff, who tally the counts for each candidate. The reader and talliers read and tally all contests, before going on to the next ballot. A variant is to project the ballots where multiple people can see them to tally.

Another approach is for three or more people to look at and tally ballots independently; if a majority agree on their tallies after a certain number of ballots, that result is accepted; otherwise they all re-tally.

A variant of all approaches is to scan all the ballots and release a file of the images, so anyone can count them. Parties and citizens can count these images by hand or by software. The file gives them evidence to resolve discrepancies. 

The fact that different parties and citizens count with independent systems protects against errors from bugs and hacks. A checksum for the file identifies true copies.
Election machines which scan ballots typically create such image files automatically,
though those images can be hacked or be subject to bugs if the election machine is hacked or has bugs. Independent scanners can also create image files. Copies of ballots are known to be available for release in many parts of the United States.
The press obtained copies of many ballots in the 2000 Presidential election in Florida to recount after the Supreme Court halted official recounts. Different methods resulted in different winners.

When manual counts happen
The tallying may be done at night at the end of the last day of voting, as in Britain, Canada, France, Germany, and Spain, or the next day, or 1–2 weeks later in the US, after provisional ballots have been adjudicated.

If counting is not done immediately, or if courts accept challenges which can require re-examination of ballots, the ballots need to be securely stored, which is problematic.

Australia federal elections count ballots at least twice, at the polling place and, starting Monday night after election day, at counting centres.

Errors in manual counts
Hand-counting can be boring, so officials lose track, or they fail to read their own tally sheets correctly at the end of the process.
Average errors in candidate tallies in New Hampshire towns were 2.5% in 2002, including one town with errors up to 20%. Omitting that town cut the average error to 0.87%. Only the net result for each candidate in each town could be measured, by assuming the careful manual recount was fully accurate. Total error can be higher if there were countervailing errors hidden in the net result, but net error in the overall electorate is what determines winners. Connecticut towns in 2007 to 2013 had similar errors up to 2%.

Errors were smaller in candidate tallies for precincts in Wisconsin recounted in 2011 and 2016. The average net discrepancy was 0.28% of the recount tally in 2011 and 0.18% in 2016.

Errors were 3% to 27% for various candidates in a 2016 Indiana race, because the tally sheet labels misled officials into over-counting groups of 5 tally marks, and officials sometimes omitted absentee ballots or double-counted ballots.

India hand tallies paper records from a 1.5% sample of election machines before releasing results. For each voter the machine prints the selected candidate on a slip of paper, displays it to the voter, and drops the slip into a box. In the April–May 2019 elections for the lower house of Congress, the Lok Sabha, the Election Commission hand-tallied the slips of paper from 20,675 voting machines (out of 1,350,000 machines) and found discrepancies for 8 machines, usually of four votes or less. Most machines tally over 16 candidates, and they did not report how many of these candidate tallies were discrepant. They formed investigation teams to report within ten days, were still investigating in November 2019, with no report as of June 2021. Hand tallies before and after 2019 had a perfect match with machine counts.

An experiment with multiple types of ballots counted by multiple teams found average errors of 0.5% in candidate tallies when one person, watched by another, read to two people tallying independently. Almost all these errors were overcounts. The same ballots had errors of 2.1% in candidate tallies from sort and stack. These errors were equally divided between undercounts and overcounts of the candidates. Optical scan ballots, which were tallied by both methods, averaged 1.87% errors, equally divided between undercounts and overcounts. Since it was an experiment, the true numbers were known. Participants thought that having the candidate names printed in larger type and bolder than the office and party would make hand tallies faster and more accurate.

Intentional errors hand tallying election results are fraud. Close review by observers, if allowed, may detect fraud, and the observers may or may not be believed. 
If only one person sees each ballot and reads off its choice, there is no check on that person's mistakes. In the US only Massachusetts and the District of Columbia give anyone but officials a legal right to see ballot marks during hand counting.
If fraud is detected and proven, penalties may be light or delayed. US prosecution policy since the 1980s has been to let fraudulent winners take office and keep office, usually for years, until convicted,

and to impose sentencing level 8-14, which earns less than two years of prison.

Data in the table are comparable, because average error in candidate tallies as percent of candidate tallies, weighted by number of votes for each candidate (in NH) is mathematically the same as the sum of absolute values of errors in each candidate's tally, as percent of all ballots (in other studies).

Time needed and cost of manual counts

Cost depends on pay levels and staff time needed, recognizing that staff generally work in teams of two or three (one to read and one or two to record votes). Teams of four, with two to read and two to record are more secure and would increase costs. Each minute per vote checked means 25 cents per vote at $15/hour, or $250 per thousand votes, or $5,000 per thousand ballots, with 20 votes on each ballot. One experiment with identical ballots of various types and multiple teams found that sorting ballots into stacks took longer and had more errors than two people reading to two talliers.

Mechanical counting
Mechanical voting machines have voters selecting switches (levers), 

pushing plastic chips through holes, or pushing mechanical buttons which increment a mechanical counter (sometimes called the odometer) for the appropriate candidate.

There is no record of individual votes to check.

Errors in mechanical counting
Tampering with the gears or initial settings can change counts, or gears can stick when a small object is caught in them, so they fail to count some votes. When not maintained well the counters can stick and stop counting additional votes; staff may or may not choose to fix the problem.
Also, election staff can read the final results wrong off the back of the machine.

Electronic counting

Electronic machines for elections are being procured around the world, often with donor money. In places with honest independent election commissions, machines can add efficiency, though not usually transparency. Where the election commission is weaker, expensive machines can be fetishized, waste money on kickbacks and divert attention, time and resources from harmful practices, as well as reducing transparency.

An Estonian study compared the staff, computer, and other costs of different ways of voting to the numbers of voters, and found highest costs per vote were in lightly-used, heavily staffed early in-person voting. Lowest costs per vote were in internet voting and in-person voting on election day at local polling places, because of the large numbers of voters served by modest staffs. For internet voting they do not break down the costs. They show steps to decrypt internet votes and imply but do not say they are hand-counted.

Optical scan counting

In an optical scan voting system, or marksense, each voter's choices are marked on one or more pieces of paper, which then go through a scanner. The scanner creates an electronic image of each ballot, interprets it, creates a tally for each candidate, and usually stores the image for later review.

The voter may mark the paper directly, usually in a specific location for each candidate, either by filling in an oval or by using a patterned stamp that can be easily detected by OCR software.

Of the voter may pick one pre-marked ballot among many, each with its own barcode or QR code corresponding to a candidate.

Or the voter may select choices on an electronic screen, which then prints the chosen names, usually with a bar code or QR code summarizing all choices, on a sheet of paper to put in the scanner. This screen and printer is called an electronic ballot marker (EBM) or ballot marking device (BMD), and voters with disabilities can communicate with it by headphones, large buttons, sip and puff, or paddles, if they cannot interact with the screen or paper directly. Typically the ballot marking device does not store or tally votes. The paper it prints is the official ballot, put into a scanning system which counts the barcodes, or the printed names can be hand-counted, as a check on the machines. Most voters do not look at the paper to ensure it reflects their choices, and when there is a mistake, an experiment found that 81% of registered voters do not report errors to poll workers.

Two companies, Hart and Clear Ballot, have scanners which count the printed names, which voters had a chance to check, rather than bar codes and QR codes, which voters are unable to check.

Timing of optical scans
The machines are faster than hand-counting, so are typically used the night after the election, to give quick results. The paper ballots and electronic memories still need to be stored, to check that the images are correct, and to be available for court challenges.

Errors in optical scans

Scanners have a row of photo-sensors which the paper passes by, and they record light and dark pixels from the ballot. A black streak results when a scratch or paper dust causes a sensor to record black continuously.
 A white streak can result when a sensor fails. In the right place, such lines can indicate a vote for every candidate or no votes for anyone. Some offices blow compressed air over the scanners after every 200 ballots to remove dust.
Fold lines in the wrong places can also count as votes.

Software can miscount; if it miscounts drastically enough, people notice and check. Staff rarely can say who caused an error, so they do not know whether it was accidental or a hack. Errors from 2002-2008 were listed and analyzed by the Brennan Center in 2010. There have been numerous examples before and since.

In a 2020 election in Baltimore, Maryland, the private company which printed ballots shifted the location of some candidates on some ballots up one line, so the scanner looked in the wrong places on the paper and reported the wrong numbers. It was caught because a popular incumbent got implausibly few votes.
In a 2018 New York City election when the air was humid, ballots jammed in the scanner, or multiple ballots went through a scanner at once, hiding all but one.
In a 2000 Bernalillo County (Albuquerque area), New Mexico, election, a programming error meant that straight-party votes on paper ballots were not counted for the individual candidates. The number of ballots was thus much larger than the number of votes in each contest. The software was fixed, and the ballots were re-scanned to get correct counts.
In the 2000 Florida presidential race the most common optical scanning error was to treat as an overvote a ballot where the voter marked a candidate and wrote in the same candidate.

Researchers find security flaws in all election computers, which let voters, staff members or outsiders disrupt or change results, often without detection.
Security reviews and audits are discussed in Electronic voting in the United States#Security reviews.

When a ballot marking device prints a bar code or QR code along with candidate names, the candidates are represented in the bar code or QR code as numbers, and the scanner counts those codes, not the names. If a bug or hack makes the numbering system in the ballot marking device not aligned with the numbering system in the scanner, votes will be tallied for the wrong candidates. This numbering mismatch has appeared with direct recording electronic machines (below).

Some US states check a small number of places by hand-counting or use of machines independent of the original election machines.

Recreated ballots
Recreated ballots are paper
or electronic
ballots created by election staff when originals cannot be counted for some reason. They usually apply to optical scan elections, not hand-counting. Reasons include tears, water damage and folds which prevent feeding through scanners. Reasons also include voters selecting candidates by circling them or other marks, when machines are only programmed to tally specific marks in front of the candidate's name.
As many as 8% of ballots in an election may be recreated.

Recreating ballots is sometimes called reconstructing ballots, ballot replication, ballot remaking or ballot transcription.
The term "duplicate ballot" sometimes refers to these recreated ballots, and sometimes to extra ballots erroneously given to or received from a voter.

Recreating can be done manually, or by scanners with manual review.

Because of its potential for fraud, recreation of ballots is usually done by teams of two people working together 
or closely observed by bipartisan teams. 
The security of a team process can be undermined by having one person read to the other, so only one looks at the original votes and one looks at the recreated votes, or by having the team members appointed by a single official.

When auditing an election, audits need to be done with the original ballots, not the recreated ones.

Cost of scanning systems
List prices of optical scanners in the US in 2002-2019, ranged from $5,000 to $111,000 per machine, depending primarily on speed. List prices add up to $1 to $4 initial cost per registered voter. Discounts vary, based on negotiations for each buyer, not on number of machines purchased. Annual fees often cost 5% or more per year, and sometimes over 10%. Fees for training and managing the equipment during elections are additional. Some jurisdictions lease the machines so their budgets can stay relatively constant from year to year. Researchers say that the steady flow of income from past sales, combined with barriers to entry, reduces the incentive for vendors to improve voting technology.

If most voters mark their own paper ballots and one marking device is available at each polling place for voters with disabilities, Georgia's total cost of machines and maintenance for 10 years, starting 2020, has been estimated at $12 per voter ($84 million total). Pre-printed ballots for voters to mark would cost $4 to $20 per voter ($113 million to $224 million total machines, maintenance and printing). The low estimate includes $0.40 to print each ballot, and more than enough ballots for historic turnout levels. the high estimate includes $0.55 to print each ballot, and enough ballots for every registered voter, including three ballots (of different parties) for each registered voter in primary elections with historically low turnout. The estimate is $29 per voter ($203 million total) if all voters use ballot marking devices, including $0.10 per ballot for paper.

The capital cost of machines in 2019 in Pennsylvania is $11 per voter if most voters mark their own paper ballots and a marking device is available at each polling place for voters with disabilities, compared to $23 per voter if all voters use ballot marking devices. This cost does not include printing ballots.

New York has an undated comparison of capital costs and a system where all voters use ballot marking devices costing over twice as much as a system where most do not. The authors say extra machine maintenance would exacerbate that difference, and printing cost would be comparable in both approaches. Their assumption of equal printing costs differs from the Georgia estimates of $0.40 or $0.50 to print a ballot in advance, and $0.10 to print it in a ballot marking device.

Direct-recording electronic counting

A touch screen displays choices to the voter, who selects choices, and can change their mind as often as needed, before casting the vote. Staff initialize each voter once on the machine, to avoid repeat voting. Voting data and ballot images are recorded in memory components, and can be copied out at the end of the election.

The system may also provide a means for communicating with a central location for reporting results and receiving updates,
which is an access point for hacks and bugs to arrive.

Some of these machines also print names of chosen candidates on paper for the voter to verify. These names on paper can be used for election audits and recounts if needed. The tally of the voting data is stored in a removable memory component and in bar codes on the paper tape. The paper tape is called a Voter-verified paper audit trail (VVPAT). The VVPATs can be counted at 20–43 seconds of staff time per vote (not per ballot).

For machines without VVPAT, there is no record of individual votes to check.

Errors in direct-recording electronic voting
This approach can have software errors. It does not include scanners, so there are no scanner errors. When there is no paper record, it is hard to notice or research most errors.
The only forensic examination which has been done of direct-recording software files was in Georgia in 2020, and found that one or more unauthorized intruders had entered the files and erased records of what it did to them. In 2014-2017 an intruder had control of the state computer in Georgia which programmed vote-counting machines for all counties. The same computer also held voter registration records. The intrusion exposed all election files in Georgia since then to compromise and malware. Public disclosure came in 2020 from a court case. Georgia did not have paper ballots to measure the amount of error in electronic tallies. The FBI studied that computer in 2017, and did not report the intrusion.
A 2018 study of direct-recording voting machines (iVotronic) without VVPAT in South Carolina found that every election from 2010-2018 had some memory cards fail. The investigator also found that lists of candidates were different in the central and precinct machines, so 420 votes which were properly cast in the precinct were erroneously added to a different contest in the central official tally, and unknown numbers were added to other contests in the central official tallies. The investigator found the same had happened in 2010. There were also votes lost by garbled transmissions, which the state election commission saw but did not report as an issue. 49 machines reported that their three internal memory counts disagreed, an average of 240 errors per machine, but the machines stayed in use, and the state evaluation did not report the issue, and there were other error codes and time stamp errors.
In a 2017 York County, Pennsylvania, election, a programming error in a county's machines without VVPAT let voters vote more than once for the same candidate. Some candidates had filed as both Democrat and Republican, so they were listed twice in races where voters could select up to three candidates, so voters could select both instances of the same name. They recounted the DRE machines' electronic records of votes and found 2,904 pairs of double votes.
In a 2011 Fairfield Township, New Jersey, election a programming error in a machine without a VVPAT gave two candidates low counts. They collected more affidavits by voters who voted for them than the computer tally gave them, so a judge ordered a new election which they won.
A 2007 study for the Ohio Secretary of State reported on election software from ES&S, Premier and Hart. Besides the problems it found, it noted that all "election systems rely heavily on third party software that implement interfaces to the operating systems, local databases, and devices such as optical scanners... the construction and features of this software is unknown, and may contain undisclosed vulnerabilities such trojan horses or other malware."

General issues

Interpretation, in any counting method

Election officials or optical scanners decide if a ballot is valid before tallying it. Reasons why it might not be valid include: more choices selected than allowed; incorrect voter signature or details on ballots received by mail, if allowed; lack of poll worker signatures, if required; forged ballot (wrong paper, printing or security features); stray marks which could identify who cast the ballot (to earn payments); and blank ballots, though these may be counted separately as abstentions.

For paper ballots officials decide if the voter's intent is clear, since voters may mark lightly, or circle their choice, instead of marking as instructed. The ballot may be visible to observers to ensure agreement, by webcam or passing around a table, or the process may be private. In the US only Massachusetts and the District of Columbia give anyone but officials a legal right to see ballot marks during hand counting.
For optical scans, the software has rules to interpret voter intent, based on the darkness of marks. Software may ignore circles around a candidate name, and paper dust or broken sensors can cause marks to appear or disappear, not where the voter intended.

Officials also check if the number of voters checked in at the polling place matches the number of ballots voted, and that the votes plus remaining unused ballots matches the number of ballots sent to the polling place. If not, they look for the extra ballots, and may report discrepancies.

Secure storage to enable counts in future

If ballots or other paper or electronic records of an election may be needed for counting or court review after a period of time, they need to be stored securely.

Election storage often uses tamper-evident seals, 
although seals can typically be removed and reapplied without damage, especially in the first 48 hours. Photos taken when the seal is applied can be compared to photos taken when the seal is opened.
Detecting subtle tampering requires substantial training. Election officials usually take too little time to examine seals, and observers are too far away to check seal numbers, though they could compare old and new photos projected on a screen. If seal numbers and photos are kept for later comparison, these numbers and photos need their own secure storage. Seals can also be forged. Seals and locks can be cut so observers cannot trust the storage. If the storage is breached, election results cannot be checked and corrected.

Experienced testers can usually bypass all physical security systems. Locks 
and cameras
are vulnerable before and after delivery.
Guards can be bribed or blackmailed. Insider threats
and the difficulty of following all security procedures are usually under-appreciated, and most organizations do not want to learn their vulnerabilities.

Security recommendations include preventing access by anyone alone,
which would typically require two hard-to-pick locks, and having keys held by independent officials if such officials exist in the jurisdiction; having storage risks identified by people other than those who design or manage the system; and using background checks on staff.

No US state has adequate laws on physical security of the ballots.

Starting the tally soon after voting ends makes it feasible for independent parties to guard storage sites.

Secure transport and internet

The ballots can be carried securely to a central station for central tallying, or they can be tallied at each polling place, manually or by machine, and the results sent securely to the central elections office. Transport is often accompanied by representatives of different parties to ensure honest delivery. Colorado transmits voting records by internet from counties to the Secretary of State, with hash values also sent by internet to try to identify accurate transmissions.

Postal voting is common worldwide, though France stopped it in the 1970s because of concerns about ballot security. Voters who receive a ballot at home may also hand-deliver it or have someone else to deliver it. The voter may be forced or paid to vote a certain way, or ballots may be changed or lost during the delivery process,

or delayed so they arrive too late to be counted or for signature mis-matches to be resolved.

Postal voting lowered turnout in California by 3%.
It raised turnout in Oregon only in Presidential election years by 4%, turning occasional voters into regular voters, without bringing in new voters.
Election offices do not mail to people who have not voted recently, and letter carriers do not deliver to recent movers they do not know, omitting mobile populations.

Some jurisdictions let ballots be sent to the election office by email, fax, internet or app. 
Email and fax are highly insecure.
Internet so far has also been insecure, including in Switzerland,
Australia,
and Estonia.
Apps try to verify the correct voter is using the app by name, date of birth and signature,
which are widely available for most voters, so can be faked; or by name, ID and video selfie, which can be faked by loading a pre-recorded video. Apps have been particularly criticized for operating on insecure phones, and pretending to more security during transmission than they have.

See also
 Recount
 Tally (voting)
 Electronic voting
 Electronic voting in Switzerland
 Voting machine
 Electoral system
 Ballot
Election audits
Elections
Electoral fraud
Electoral integrity
List of close election results

References

External links
 The Election Technology Library research list – a comprehensive list of research relating to technology use in elections
 E-Voting information from ACE Project
 AEI-Brookings Election Reform Project
 
 Voting and Elections by Douglas W. Jones: Thorough articles about the history and problems with Voting Machinery
 Selker, Ted Scientific American Magazine Fixing the Vote October 2004
 The Machinery of Democracy: Voting System Security, Accessibility, Usability, and Cost from Brennan Center for Justice at NYU School of Law
An index of articles on vote counting from the ACE Project guide to designing and administering elections

Elections
Statistical methods
Elections in the United States
Articles containing video clips
 
Voting